2005 Urawa Red Diamonds season

Competitions

Domestic results

J. League 1

League table

Results summary

Result round by round

Matches

Emperor's Cup

Urawa Red Diamonds received a bye to the fourth round as being part of the J.League Division 1.

Urawa Red Diamonds qualified to the 2006 Japanese Super Cup and the 2007 AFC Champions League.

J. League Cup

Group stage

Quarterfinals

Semifinals

International results

Saitama City Cup

Player statistics

Other pages
 J. League official site

Urawa Red Diamonds
Urawa Red Diamonds seasons